Chris Poland (born December 1, 1957) is an American guitarist, best known as the former guitarist of the thrash metal band Megadeth. Since 2002, Poland has been the guitarist of the instrumental rock/jazz fusion bands OHM and OHMphrey, among others, and has appeared on several projects and albums from a variety of different genres.

Biography

Megadeth (1984–1987)
Frontman Dave Mustaine referred to Poland as "an amazing guitar player—he can play circles around me".

Poland joined Megadeth in 1984, after seeing them play as a three-piece, and after being recommended to Mustaine and Ellefson by Megadeth's then-new drummer Gar Samuelson, a friend and former bandmate of Poland's.
According to Mustaine, Poland was temporarily let go before Megadeth embarked on their first tour, but was swiftly brought back. He then remained in the band until he and Samuelson were fired in 1987, due to alleged substance abuse, which had led Poland to sell off Mustaine and Ellefson's guitar gear, along with his own. In response, Mustaine wrote the song "Liar" for their following album So Far, So Good... So What!, which was partly meant as a callout to Poland.

Circle Jerks
Poland played bass with Circle Jerks briefly in 1989, replacing Zander Schloss.

Rust in Peace demos
In 1990, Mustaine asked Poland to record solos for demos that would become songs for Rust In Peace. Poland agreed to play the solos, but did not rejoin the band. Ultimately, Megadeth recruited Marty Friedman to play the solos for the album. Poland's solos can be heard on the 2004 remastered version of Rust In Peace.

Final return to Megadeth and lawsuit
He and Mustaine teamed up one final time in 2004 to record Megadeth's comeback album, The System Has Failed, though Poland opted not to rejoin the band full-time.

In 2004, after the reissue and re-release of Rust in Peace, Poland and/or his management and attorney filed a lawsuit against Mustaine regarding the use of the three Rust In Peace demos on the album's reissue without Poland's permission. Poland eventually settled for $9,500 and thereby ended a professional relationship with Mustaine and Megadeth.

2000s
In 2009, Poland formed OHMphrey, a side-project with Robby Pagliari of OHM, and Jake Cinninger, Kris Myers, and Joel Cummins of progressive rock band Umphrey's McGee.

In 2019, Poland appeared on the track "Hammer (Comes Down)", on Megadeth bassist David Ellefson's solo release Sleeping Giants, with Mark Tremonti, Thom Hazaert, Dave McClain and Joey Radziwill of Sacred Reich, and Flotsam and Jetsam vocalist Eric AK. It was later announced Poland had signed to Ellefson's revived Combat Records, who would release a 30th Anniversary Edition of his solo debut Return to Metalopolis in 2020. The expanded 2-CD/LP configuration, features a remastered version of the original LP, with four new tracks, and material from the independently released, out of print 2007 release Return to Metalopolis Live. It was later announced in 2020 that Poland would tour Australia and Japan, with Ellefson and Hazaert, supporting Ellefson's eponymous solo band.

In January 2020, Poland was inducted into the Metal Hall of Fame, alongside Geoff Tate, Don Dokken, Joe Satriani, Steve Vai, Prong, Graham Bonnet, and more. Poland was inducted by Hazaert and former Machine Head guitarist Phil Demmel who joined Poland for a performance of "Peace Sells", with Butcher Babies bassist Ricky Bonazza, and Dead by Wednesday drummer Opus Lawrence and guitarist Dave Sharpe, who also tour with Ellefson and Hazaert in Ellefson's "Sleeping Giants" solo band. Poland also performed "Paranoid" at the induction, with Vai, Satriani, and Tate.

Discography

Solo albums
1990: Return to Metalopolis
2000: Chasing the Sun
2000: Rare Trax (compilation)
2007: Return to Metalopolis Live (live)
2019: Resistance
2020: Return to Metalopolis 30th Anniversary Edition

With Megadeth
1985: Killing Is My Business... and Business Is Good!
1986: Peace Sells... But Who's Buying?
1990: Rust in Peace (Poland's solos appear on the demo recordings of "Holy Wars... The Punishment Due", "Take No Prisoners", and "Rust in Peace... Polaris", which were released as bonus tracks on the 2004 remaster)
2000: Capitol Punishment: The Megadeth Years (compilation)
2004: The System Has Failed
2005: Greatest Hits: Back to the Start (compilation)
2007: Warchest (compilation)
2008: Anthology: Set the World Afire (compilation)
2019: Warheads on Foreheads (compilation)

With Damn the Machine
1993: Damn the Machine
1993: Silence EP

With Mumbo's Brain
1995: Excerpts from the Book of Mumbo
1999: Rare Trax

With Lamb of God
2003: As the Palaces Burn
2004: Ashes of the Wake

With OHM
2003: OHM
2004: "Live" On KPFK 90.7 FM, Lion Music
2005: Amino Acid Flashback
2006: Live at the New Brookland Tavern (DVD)
2008: Circus of Sound
2012: Tsunami Jams

With OHMphrey
2009: OHMphrey, Magna Carta
2012: Posthaste, Magna Carta

With Polcat
2012: Polcat, Ashro Records

Other album appearances
2001: Warmth in the Wilderness: A Tribute to Jason Becker, Lion Music 
2002: Squadrophenia, Cosmosquad, Marmaduke Records 
2004: Give Us Moore! – Gary Moore Tribute, Lion Music
2006: The Longest Night, Pharaoh
2006: Double Heart Project – Human Nature's Fight, Brennus
2006: Jimi Hendrix Tribute – The Spirit Lives On Vol. 1 & 2, Lion Music
2007: Long Live Me, THE SCREAMIN' LORDS, Brannick Records
2008: Innervisions, Tadashi Goto, Progrock
2009: Guitars That Ate My Brain2009: Misty Mountain Hop: A Millennium Tribute to Led Zeppelin2009: The Call of the Flames, Shredding the Envelope, Standstill And Scream Music
2011: Metalusion, Glen Drover, Magna Carta 
2012: Plains of Oblivion – Jeff Loomis2012: Two Minutes to Midnight: A Millennium Tribute to Iron Maiden, Versailles Records
2013: Intermezzo, Michael Angelo Batio
2013: Virtue and Vices, Robot Lords of Tokyo, RLoT Records
2013: Frequency Unknown Queensryche(guest appearance), Cleopatra
2013: Belt Buckles and Brass Knuckles, Moccasin Creek, Moccasin Creek Music
2014: Curve of the Earth – Lion Drome
2014: Will to Power – Lord Vulture, Mausoleum Records
2014: Onward to Freedom – Tourniquet
2016: The Art of Loss - Redemption
2018: Gazing at Medusa – Tourniquet
2018: Long Night's Journey into Day - Redemption
2019: Sleeping Giants'' - David Ellefson
2020: Alive In Color - Redemption

References

External links
2006 Chris Poland Interview – by Brian D. Holland
Tone Center Records, OHM's record company

1957 births
Living people
American heavy metal guitarists
American jazz guitarists
Megadeth members
Lead guitarists
People from Dunkirk, New York
Guitarists from New York (state)
American male guitarists
20th-century American guitarists
Jazz musicians from New York (state)
American male jazz musicians
OHMphrey members
OHM (band) members
Circle Jerks members
Redemption (band) members